The CCHA Scholar-Athlete of the Year was an annual award given out at the conclusion of the Central Collegiate Hockey Association regular season to the best scholar in the conference as voted by the coaches of each CCHA team. Faculty representatives select the player, who must have at least a 3.25 GPA through the end of the fall semester, who will be named as the scholar-athlete for each team in the CCHA with each nominee being eligible for the conference award.

The 'Scholar-Athlete of the Year' was first awarded in 2005 and every year thereafter until 2013 when the CCHA was dissolved as a consequence of the Big Ten forming its men's ice hockey conference. The award is expected to be revived in the 2021–22 season when a new CCHA begins play.

Michael Eickman is the only player to win the award more than once.

Award winners

Winners by school

Winners by position

See also
CCHA Awards

References

General

Specific

External links
CCHA Awards (Incomplete) 

College ice hockey trophies and awards in the United States
CCHA